Carol Potter (born May 21, 1948) is an American actress best known for playing  Cindy Walsh on Beverly Hills, 90210.

Life and career
Potter was born in New York City, New York, and attended high school in Tenafly, New Jersey, and went on to attend Radcliffe College, where she earned a Bachelor of Arts in social relations. In 1977, she made her Broadway theatre debut in Albert Innaurato's play Gemini, which went on to become the fifth-longest running non-musical play in Broadway history.

Potter had her first role as a regular in a prime time television series in 1981, playing Maggie Clinton on Today's F.B.I. In 1985, she married screenwriter Spencer Eastman, and their son Christopher was born in 1987. Three months later, Eastman was diagnosed with lung cancer, and he died in 1988. Potter married for a second time to actor Jeffrey Josephson in October 1990, the same month Beverly Hills 90210 made its television debut.

She was a regular on Beverly Hills, 90210 from 1990 to 1995. In 1997, she was cast in NBC's Sunset Beach as Joan Cummings. She has also guest starred on many shows including NYPD Blue, JAG, Crossing Jordan and Providence.  In 2019, Potter returned to the 90210 franchise in the spin off BH90210, where she played a version of herself as a therapist for the cast.

She also appeared on a special "TV Moms" episode of the Anne Robinson version of The Weakest Link, in which she won $124,000 for her charity, beating June Lockhart.

Filmography

References

External links 
 
 

1948 births
American television actresses
Living people
People from Tenafly, New Jersey
Radcliffe College alumni
20th-century American actresses
21st-century American actresses
American soap opera actresses